Philippe Chevallier  (born 11 January 1956 in Redon, Ille-et-Vilaine) is a French comedian and actor best known for his collaboration with Régis Laspalès.

In 2002 he starred in Ma femme s'appelle Maurice.

Filmography
 1994 : Tête à tête by Jean-Hugues Lime
 1997 : Le Pari by Didier Bourdon and Bernard Campan
 1998 : Ca n'empêche pas les sentiments by Jean-Pierre Jackson
 2000 : Antilles sur Seine by  Pascal Légitimus
 2004 : Les Gaous by Igor SK
 2002 : Ma femme s'appelle Maurice by Jean-Marie Poiré
 2004 : Tu vas rire mais je te quitte by Philippe Harel
 2014 : Brèves de comptoir by Jean-Michel Ribes

External links

 

1956 births
Living people
People from Redon, Ille-et-Vilaine
French male film actors
French comedians